Gold Dust is the Second studio album from Welsh rock band The Dirty Youth.  It was released on 11 May 2015 via Universal Records

Singles
1. Alive was released on 23 March 2014, a year and nearly 2 months prior to the full album, it's B-sides included "Alive (Unplugged)" and "Alive (Biometrix Remix)", Alive's music video was released on 29 January 2014.

2. The One was released on 6 April 2015, one month prior to the release of the full album, it's B-sides included "The One (Stripped Piano Version)" and "The One (Biometrix vs the Senate Remix)", The One's music video was  released on 2 February 2015.

3. Just Move on was released on 13 November 2015, with a double A side single for a cover of Blondie's Atomic. Just Move On's music video was released by Kerrang! on 6 November 2015.

Track listing

total length = 42:28

Personnel

Band
 Danni Monroe - lead vocals
 Matt Bond - guitar/piano
 Luke Padfield - guitar
 Leon Watkins - bass guitar
 Freddie Green - drums
Philip Edwards - Drums - (All tracks except "the one")

2015 albums
The Dirty Youth albums